Kevin John Hatcher (born September 9, 1966) is an American former professional ice hockey defenseman who played in the NHL for 17 seasons between 1984 and 2001 for the Washington Capitals, Dallas Stars, Pittsburgh Penguins, New York Rangers and Carolina Hurricanes.  He is the older brother of former NHL player Derian Hatcher, with whom he was inducted into the United States Hockey Hall of Fame on October 21, 2010. Hatcher was born in Detroit, Michigan, but grew up in Sterling Heights, Michigan.

Playing career
As a youth, Hatcher played in the 1979 Quebec International Pee-Wee Hockey Tournament with a minor ice hockey team from Michigan.

Hatcher was drafted 17th overall in the 1984 NHL Entry Draft by the Washington Capitals, a team he would have the  most of his NHL success with. Hatcher played 1,157 career NHL games, scoring 227 goals and 450 assists for 677 points. He also registered 1,392 career penalty minutes. Hatcher's best season offensively was the 1992–93 season, when he scored 34 goals and 79 points, both career highs. His 34 goals that season led all NHL defensemen.

Awards and achievements
Selected to five NHL All-Star Games: 1990, 1991, 1992, 1996, 1997
United States Hockey Hall of Fame, 2010 inductee

Transactions
June 9, 1984- Washington Capitals' 1st round draft choice (17th overall) in the 1984 NHL Entry Draft.
January 18, 1995- Traded by the Washington Capitals to the Dallas Stars in exchange for Mark Tinordi and Rick Mrozik.
June 22, 1996- Traded by the Dallas Stars to the Pittsburgh Penguins in exchange for Sergei Zubov.
September 30, 1999- Traded by the Pittsburgh Penguins to the New York Rangers in exchange for Peter Popovic.
July 31, 2000- Signed as a free agent with the Carolina Hurricanes.

Career statistics

Regular season and playoffs

International

See also
List of NHL players with 1000 games played

References

External links
 

1966 births
Living people
American men's ice hockey defensemen
Carolina Hurricanes players
Dallas Stars players
Ice hockey people from Detroit
Sportspeople from Sterling Heights, Michigan
Ice hockey players at the 1998 Winter Olympics
National Hockey League All-Stars
National Hockey League first-round draft picks
New York Rangers players
North Bay Centennials players
Olympic ice hockey players of the United States
Pittsburgh Penguins players
United States Hockey Hall of Fame inductees
Washington Capitals captains
Washington Capitals draft picks
Washington Capitals players